Samuil Ivanovich Galberg or, in German, Samuel Friedrich Halberg (Russian: Самуил Иванович Гальберг; 13 December 1787, Haljala Parish - 22 May 1839, Saint Petersburg) was a Baltic-German sculptor and academician.

Biography 
He was born on a rural estate in what is now Estonia. From 1795 to 1808, he studied at the Imperial Academy of Arts under Ivan Martos. While there, he received several silver medals and a small gold medal, for a bas-relief depicting Shadrach, Meshach, and Abednego appearing before Nebuchadnezzar. He continued his studies in Rome from 1818 to 1828, where he obtained professional advice from Bertel Thorvaldsen.

Upon returning to Saint Petersburg, he became an Adjunct Professor of sculpture at the Academy. In 1830, he was awarded the title of Academician. The following year, he became a Professor in the second degree and, in 1836, was promoted to full Professor, on the basis of his works, rather than by completing the usual academic program.

His wife, Elizaveta Vasilievna, was a daughter of the sculptor, Vasily Demut-Malinovsky. They had one daughter, Olga, born in 1838.

Many of his works are busts. They include Alexander Pushkin, Vasily Perovsky, Ivan Krylov, Dmitry Golitsyn, Pyotr Kikin, and his teacher, Martos. He also created two notable monuments; for Nikolai Karamzin (1836, Ulyanovsk), and for Gavrila Derzhavin (1833, Kazan, destroyed by the Communist government in 1932).

Sources 
 
 Biography and works, by Alexei Novitsky, from the Russian Biographical Dictionary @ Russian Wikisource. 
 S. N. Kondakov, Юбилейный справочник Императорской Академии художеств. 1764-1914, Goloike & Vilborg, 1915 (Online)
 Galberg Samuil Ivanovich // Great Soviet Encyclopedia, Alexander Prokhorov (Ed.), 1969-1978

External links 

 Biography @ Русская живопись

1787 births
1839 deaths
Sculptors from the Russian Empire
Imperial Academy of Arts alumni
Members of the Imperial Academy of Arts
Baltic German people from the Russian Empire
People from Haljala Parish
19th-century sculptors from the Russian Empire
Russian male sculptors
19th-century male artists from the Russian Empire